Richard French may refer to:

 Richard French (American politician) (1792–1854), U.S. Representative from Kentucky
 Richard French (Canadian politician) (born 1947), Canadian businessman, academic and politician
 Richard French (newscaster), host of Richard French Live! program on RNN
 Richard G. French (born 1949), American planetary astronomer